Tückelhausen Charterhouse ( or Kloster Tückelhausen) is a former Carthusian monastery, or charterhouse, in Ochsenfurt in Bavaria, Germany.

History
The monastery, dedicated to Saints Lambert, John the Baptist and George, was founded in 1138 by Otto I, Bishop of Bamberg, as a double canonry of the Premonstratensians. From 1351 it belonged to the Carthusians.

The charterhouse was dissolved in 1803 during the secularisation of Bavaria and passed mostly into private ownership. The prior's lodging became the parish priest's house, while the monks' cells were turned into cottages.

Carthusian Museum
The Kloster Tückelhausen Museum displays the history of the Carthusians in Franconia and includes the reconstruction of a monk's cell. The former library contains an exhibition of contemporary artwork.

References

Carthusian monasteries in Germany
Premonstratensian monasteries in Germany
Monasteries in Bavaria
1138 establishments in Europe
1351 establishments in Europe
1803 disestablishments in Europe